Agostino Richelmy (29 November 1850 – 10 August 1923) was an Italian cardinal of the Roman Catholic Church who served as Archbishop of Turin from 1897 until his death, and was elevated to the rank of cardinal in 1899.

Biography

Early life and education
Born in Turin, Agostino Richelmy received his confirmation on 13 August 1857 and later joined the Garibaldian Volunteers in the War of 1866, wearing his red shirt under his cassock for years afterwards. He attended Liceo classico Cavour and studied at the seminary in Turin, from where he obtained his doctorate in theology on 18 May 1876. He was ordained to the priesthood on 25 April 1873 and finished his studies three years later. Within the Archdiocese of Turin, Richelmy taught at its seminary, served as a prosynodal examiner, and was a canon of the cathedral chapter.

Episcopate
On 7 June 1886 he was appointed Bishop of Ivrea by Pope Leo XIII. Richelmy received his episcopal consecration on the following 28 October from Cardinal Gaetano Alimonda, with Bishops Davide Riccardi and Giovanni Bertagna serving as co-consecrators. He was later named Archbishop of Turin on 18 September 1897.

Cardinalate
Pope Leo created him cardinal priest of Sant'Eusebio in the consistory of 18 June 1899. After participating in the 1903 papal conclave, Richelmy's cardinalatial church was transferred to Santa Maria in Via on 27 November 1911. He was one of the cardinal electors in the conclave of 1914, and also in that of 1922, which selected Pope Benedict XV and Pope Pius XI respectively. In 1915, when Italy entered World War I, Richelmy organized priests for duty as army chaplains in the mountains of Trentino, where they carved altars out of snow and said Mass in below-zero temperatures.

The Cardinal died in Turin, at age 72. He was initially buried at the chapel for the clergy in the Turin cemetery, but his remains were transferred in 1927 to the Santuario della Consolata, where they lie in a pink marble sarcophagus.

Richelmy succeeded Davide Riccardi, who assisted in the former's episcopal consecration, as both Bishop of Ivrea and Archbishop of Turin.

References

Sources
 
 Vaudagnotti, Attilio (1926). Il cardinale Agostino Richelmy. Torino, Roma: Marietti, 1926.

External links
Cardinals of the Holy Roman Church
Catholic-Hierarchy

1850 births
1923 deaths
20th-century Italian cardinals
Cardinals created by Pope Leo XIII
Archbishops of Turin
Bishops of Ivrea
19th-century Italian Roman Catholic bishops
20th-century Italian Roman Catholic archbishops